Skyway Costa Rica is a regional airline based in San José, Costa Rica. It operates daily scheduled passenger services to 8 domestic destinations and 1 international destination. Its hub is located at Juan Santamaría International Airport.

Destinations  

Skyway Costa Rica operates services to the following scheduled destinations:

 Drake Bay
 Bocas del Toro, Panama
 La Fortuna/Arenal
 Liberia
 Osa/Corcovado
 Puerto Jiménez 
 Quepos/Manuel Antonio
 San José (hub)
 Playa Tamarindo

Fleet 
Skyway Costa Rica started operations with 3 Let L-410 Turbolet aircraft.

References 

Airlines of Costa Rica
Airlines established in 2017
2017 establishments in Costa Rica